DCeased is a six-issue comic book miniseries published by DC Comics from May to October 2019. It was created by writer Tom Taylor and the artistic team including penciler Trevor Hairsine and inker Stefano Guadiano. The story takes place in an alternate Earth, where a corrupted version of the Anti-Life Equation has infected most of Earth's inhabitants with a zombie-like virus. Lois Lane acts as the series' narrator, detailing how the events took place over the course of a few weeks.

Publication history 
A routinely strong performer, the first issue was released in May 2019, and was ranked #1 in the comic book sales for that period. Issue two also sold strongly, coming in at #2 for the month of June at 152,407 units. Sales dipped slightly for issue three, coming in at #3 in July at 132,072 units, with a further decrease in August for issue four (down to roughly 120,000 units).

Expanded material

Spin-offs
 DCeased: A Good Day to Die #1 (2019)
 DCeased: Unkillables #1–3 (2019)
 DCeased: Hope at World's End #1–15 (2020)

Sequels
 DCeased: Dead Planet #1–7 (2020–2021)
 DCeased: War of the Undead Gods #1–8 (2022–2023)

Plot

DCeased 
In the aftermath of a battle with the forces of Apokolips, Batman discovers that Cyborg has been kidnapped. On Apokolips, Cyborg is being tortured by DeSaad, who reveals that one-half of the Anti-Life Equation exists within his cybernetic body and that Darkseid intends to merge it with the half already in his possession. Darkseid summons the Black Racer, who is immediately restrained and has his essence extracted to keep Cyborg alive during the procedure. In merging the Anti-Life Equation together it becomes corrupted, manifesting itself as a techno-organic virus which infects Darkseid, causing him to go into a psychotic rampage, kill the Black Racer and leap into the core of Apokolips. DeSaad attempts to stop the virus spread by sending Cyborg back to Earth, but Darkseid unleashes the full power of his Omega Beams, obliterating the planet.

Arriving in Metropolis, Cyborg's systems come back online, allowing the virus to jump onto the internet. Hundreds of millions of people are infected instantly as the virus transmits visually from the screens of corrupted devices, transforming infected people within seconds into a feral zombie-esque state that attacks any uninfected in sight. Meanwhile, Superman is talking to Mister Miracle and Big Barda when he begins hearing the anarchy erupting across the planet. Quickly realizing how the infection is spreading, Superman flies to his apartment where his wife Lois Lane, his son Jonathan Samuel Kent (Superboy) and Damian Wayne (Robin) are watching television. Just before Lois is about to look at her phone, Superman destroys the devices with his heat vision, instructing everyone not to look at any screens. In his Batcave, Batman is observing the chaos consuming Gotham through backup analog systems. The Batcomputer informs him that 600 million people have been infected, and that it would only take the virus a few days to corrupt every device connected to the internet. Upon discovering Wayne Manor is still connected to the internet, Batman activates an emergency EMP. He searches for Alfred Pennyworth, Nightwing and Tim Drake, discovering Alfred cornered by the latter two, who are infected. Batman holds the two off in an effort to buy Alfred time to escape, but Batman is bitten and infected.

Elsewhere, Aquaman is overwhelmed by a swarm of infected and both the Joker and Green Lantern are infected from viewing corrupted screens. Green Lantern attacks Green Arrow and Black Canary. Black Canary is forced to kill Jordan whilst defending Green Arrow, unintentionally becoming Jordan's successor in the Green Lantern Corps. Meanwhile, Poison Ivy convinces Harley Quinn to break up with Joker. As Harley gives him the news, the infected Joker begins chasing her. Harley kills the Joker with a shotgun, but is attacked by the infected Birds of Prey. Back in Metropolis, Superman takes Lois, Superboy, and Robin to the roof of the Daily Planet and realizes that everyone inside is infected. At that moment, Superman hears Black Canary's cry and goes to retrieve the newly baptized Green Lantern and Green Arrow. Upon returning, Robin tells everyone that he finally got in contact with Batman. Batman explains to the group that the infected are not zombies, because they are not consumed by hunger. Referring to them as the "Anti-Living", Batman states that they are "stealing" life and spreading death and that it is being caused by the Anti-Life Equation and he too has been infected. In order to save the world, he tells Superman that he must destroy every human carrier as well as the Internet. Before being transformed, Batman tells Robin he is sorry and that Alfred has something for him. Batman succumbs to the infection and attacks Alfred, Alfred apologizes to Bruce before shooting him.

Alfred boards the Batplane heading towards Metropolis. Superman secures the Daily Planet by removing all the infected from the building and blocking the exits. He proceeds to head for Smallville, along the way helping Black Lightning take down an infected Clayface and instructs him and his family to rendezvous at the Daily Planet. Upon arrival at his family ranch, he greets his adopted mother Martha Kent who informs him his adopted father Jon Kent is infected. Superman seals him in the basement of the barn before taking his adopted mother to safety. Meanwhile, Mera is training Garth when they both notice the water above Atlantis darkening with the blood of Atlantean guards Aquaman has infected or killed. Garth inhales some of the blood and becomes infected, joining the infected led by Aquaman before being pushed back by Mera. Mera barely manages to escape as Atlantis falls to the Anti-Living.

In a Project Cadmus lab under Washington, D.C., Amanda Waller and Captain Atom await the return of Atom, who has entered an Anti-Living corpse to find a cure, but Atom fails to appear. Amanda Waller instructs Captain Atom that he has new orders to use his powers to destroy the infected from the worst affected areas of the city. Captain Atom begins destroying infected, but realizes something is wrong and doubles over in pain. The Atom has become infected and secretly invaded Captain Atom's body and is now attacking and infecting the blood cells of his heart. Meanwhile, Green Arrow and Green Canary finish setting up a broadcast warning over the radio, where Lois Lane relays to any survivors listening to gather in Metropolis to repulse the infected. Mera arrives in Themyscira where Hippolyta and Wonder Woman welcome her. Wonder Woman, after hearing Lois's broadcast, decides to go to Metropolis. Superman and Green Lantern go to Keystone City where they locate the Flash and Kid Flash. 

In Gotham City, Harley Quinn is saved by Poison Ivy, who kills the infected Birds of Prey. In Metropolis, an infected Giganta attacks the Daily Planet. Alfred arrives to distract Giganta while Superman knocks her down with a high-speed punch. Wonder Woman attempts to kill Giganta but Superman holds her back, saying that the infected could still be cured. However, Cyborg arrives and kills Giganta, informing them that the Anti-Living are not alive anymore. Alfred gives Robin a Batsuit, and informs him that Bruce is dead. Cyborg informs everyone they must leave, elaborating further that the Anti-Living are extensions of the Anti-Life Equation that can sense life and want to destroy it. At that moment, an injured Hawkgirl falls from the sky, and explains that Captain Atom is about to explode in Washington, D.C. Superman and Wonder Woman attempt to fly him into the upper atmosphere to safely explode, but he detonates in an explosion that instantly vaporizes Washington, D.C, expanding outward and obliterating several major cities. The Daily Planet survivors look on in horror as the blast consumes them all.

Superman and Wonder Woman both survive the explosion. It is revealed that Green Lantern also saved the group at the Daily Planet in a green energy shield bubble. Lex Luthor saddened by the destruction of Metropolis, arrives and offers to join forces with Superman. Over the next few weeks the heroes disable the internet to stop the Equation's spread. Wonder Woman convinces her mother to allow survivors on Themyscira. In one week, Gotham has become a jungle and Batman (Damian Wayne), Green Arrow, and Green Lantern appear outside of the wall of vines. An infected Killer Croc charges towards the trio, but he is killed by the vines, which surround the heroes. Harley Quinn and Poison Ivy then emerge from the thicket. The heroes state that they are hoping to set up a sanctuary for survivors in the Gotham jungle and Ivy reluctantly agrees, but with strict rules in place. Luthor and Cyborg work together to build two space arks, in case they ever need to leave Earth. As the days pass, the heroes in the Fortress of Solitude begin to hear a ringing in their ears before Luthor is suddenly bisected. The Flash runs in and is slashed in the back by an infected Martian Manhunter. The heroes fight him until Firestorm kills him with a fire blast. The survivors realize that Barry is infected and loose in the world, infecting and killing thousands. Kid Flash volunteers to stop him, but Superman declares he will go in his place. Superman rams into the Flash head on, obliterating him. Unfortunately, he finds two of Barry's fingers  lodged in his abdomen. He returns to the Fortress and tells Wally to send his family into the Speed Force. Superman gives a tearful and emotional farewell to his family and flies into space to deprive himself of oxygen, but before he can die, his transformation begins.

As the infected Superman begins his attack in New York, Cyborg declares they must evacuate the planet, but Lois says Superman will destroy the arks and must be stopped first. Damian reveals that he possesses a shard of kryptonite, which he gives to Cyborg. Wonder Woman states that it will not be enough and they must use lethal force against Superman. She tells Green Lantern and Cyborg to come with her, while ordering everyone else to go to the Gotham Jungle and Themyscira to prepare for departure. In Superman's forge, Wonder Women imbues the kryptonite with her magic-infused Sword of Athena, forging a weapon that combines Superman's two principal weaknesses. The trio then head out to confront Superman. With the evacuation from the Gotham Jungle completed, Poison Ivy declares she cannot abandon the Green and Harley decides to stay with her. In Themyscira, the survivors are attacked by the infected Aquaman and Kraken. Green Arrow quickly dispatches Aquaman by shooting an arrow through his eye. An army of infected Atlanteans lay siege to the island, and the whole Amazonian army lead a counterattack. The Amazons hold the line as the last refugees board the ark. Antiope is infected during the fight, and Queen Hippolyta elects to stay behind along with the remaining Amazons to cover the ark's escape, giving Wonder Girl her tiara. In the ruins of New York City, the heroes begin their attack against Superman. Both Green Lantern and Cyborg weaken Superman enough to allow Wonder Woman to get close, cut off Superman's right arm and stab him in the chest. The attack fails to stop Superman, and he delivers a lethal punch through Wonder Woman's abdomen. Spotting the fleeing arks, Superman abandons the fight. A dying Wonder Woman tells Green Lantern and Cyborg that Superman must be stopped and hands Lantern the kryptonite sword. Cyborg elects to stay behind with Wonder Woman until she turns.

On one of the arks, Superboy asks Batman to take care of his mother before departing at full-speed towards his father, colliding with him in order to buy the arks time to escape. The impact knocks Superboy out and breaks his arm, just as Green Lantern arrives on the scene. Before Superman can attack either of them, the entire Green Lantern Corps appear. Having become aware of the pandemic on Earth, Ganthet explains the Guardians decided to quarantine the planet. Realizing that the Green Lantern Corps are too powerful to take on alone, the infected Superman retreats into the Sun and begins absorbing it. Ganthet states the Corps does not have the power to reach into the Sun's core to stop Superman directly. He realizes that in time, Superman will completely absorb the Sun and the Sol System will gradually grow cold, dooming all life remaining in the system. He also states that the virus will likely go dormant after such an event occurs. Ganthet and the Green Lantern Corps escort the survivors to a new world to settle on.

On Earth, a now infected Wonder Woman is interrogated by Cyborg with the Lasso of Truth to find out if there is a cure. The Equation responds through Wonder Woman that the cure lies within Cyborg, revealing the virus is sentient and controls its victims as a hive mind. It explains to Cyborg that being both man and machine, he is the solution to the crisis as it too is a binary construct. Horrified at the revelation that the pandemic was entirely curable and that all the deaths and sacrifices were ultimately unnecessary, Cyborg carelessly lets go of the Lasso of Truth to try and message the fleeing arks. Before he can act on it however, a now-freed infected Wonder Woman takes the opportunity to attack him, tearing his head off and tossing him into a ravine. As the arks arrive at their new home, the survivors gaze upon their new homeworld, Earth 2.

Spin-offs

A Good Day to Die 
Mister Miracle and Big Barda survey the destruction of Apokolips before Boom Tubing back to Earth. Meanwhile, Mister Terrific examines an infected Captain Boomerang and realises he needs to trace the origin of the virus. He journeys to Mister Miracle's apartment to seek their aid in visiting Apokolips, only to be informed of its annihilation. Seeking another solution Terrific, Miracle and Big Barda track down Blue Beetle and Booster Gold for transportation to England. In Liverpool, John Constantine escapes from a mob of infected only to find his long time companion Chas has turned. Using his magic, he makes Chas combust before escaping the mob and crashing. He is woken by Mister Terrific and his group who seek Constantine's help in finding a magical solution to the infection. Constantine says there is no cure and refuses to help the heroes, teleporting himself away.

With technological and magical options expired, Mister Terrific theorises that the only hope for humanity is for Booster Gold to use his time machine. Journeying to Malibu they are attacked by an infected Fire and Ice. Mister Miracle and Big Barda battle the duo to give the other heroes time to find the time machine, but they soon succumb to the mobs of infected. Booster Gold and Blue Beetle locate the time machine, but they are stopped from using it by Waverider. In the Oblivion Bar, John Constantine laments the current situation to Detective Chimp before deciding it is time to be a hero. He teleports to Booster Gold's time machine where he headbutts Waverider. Before the heroes can use the machine, an infected Big Barda breaks in and tears Mister Terrific in half. While the heroes try and get Booster Gold to the time machine, Booster feels strange and Waverider comments that everything is as it should be. Booster Gold blinks out of existence leaving Big Barda to attack Blue Beetle. Constantine argues with Waverider for choosing this to be the timeline to save. Annoyed by his meddling, Constantine binds himself to Waverider stopping him from re-entering the time stream and leading to his death by the now infected Blue Beetle. As Constantine readies for his own death, Dr. Fate and Zatanna arrive and rescue him.

Unkillables 
Deathstroke encounters infected neo-nazis, but becomes one of the infected after attempting to use his phone. A day later his healing factor purges the equation and returns him to normal. Meanwhile, Deathstroke's daughter Rose Wilson is trapped in her apartment. Deathstroke tells her to go on the roof but is attacked by an infected Man-Bat and crashes into the apartment. Rose stabs her father, but Deathstroke yells in pain making Rose realize Deathstroke is not infected. Shortly after, Mirror Master contacts them to protect Vandal Savage, in exchange he will bring them to Savage's hideout on a remote island. The duo agree and find they are not the only ones helping Savage as Deadshot, Bane, Lady Shiva, Cheetah, Captain Cold, Solomon Grundy, and Creeper are also there. 

Jason Todd goes to the Batcave and discovers the bodies of Nightwing, Batman, and Tim Drake. He buries them and takes Batman's dog, Ace, with him in the Batmobile. Using a tracking computer, Jason discovers only two members of the Bat family are still alive in Gotham. At the Gotham City Police Department, Cassandra Cain, Harvey Bullock, and Commissioner James Gordon are fighting off infected when Harvey is slashed. He begs Gordon to kill him, but Cassandra intervenes and breaks his neck. Jason arrives in the Batmobile and dispatches the infected. He takes Gordan and Cassandra with him. As they leave Gotham, Jason informs Gordon of the civilian identities of the Bat family and tells them of their deaths, including his daughter, Barbara Gordon. He takes Gordon to Barbara's corpse. Jason then takes the trio to Bludhaven where they arrive at an orphanage with only children left. 

The orphans tell them that an unknown hero locked all the infected in a cafeteria and provided the children ample food before disappearing. Three weeks later, Jason tells Gordon that they must neutralize the infected in the cafeteria, but Gordon replies he will not willingly kill infected children. Cassandra calls the two over the radio, where they overhear Lois Lane's final evacuation message. Jason and Cassandra believe they could make it to the evacuation in Gotham City, but Gordon argues that they couldn't safely get all the children there. The trio decide not to tell the children that their heroes left them. Meanwhile, Mirror Master tells Shiva that he's found Cassandra, and Shiva arrives in Bludhaven in an attempt to convince her daughter to join her but the two argue and begin to fight. Jason tries to intervene and is knocked out by Shiva. Gordon and some of the children arrive to defuse the fight, and Cassandra declares that this is her family now and offers Shiva to stay with them.  Shiva refuses and leaves with Mirror Master to their hideout. Upon her return, Savage berates Shiva for using Mirror Master. Deathstroke states that Savage needs to avoid upsetting the other villains in order for the group to survive. Savage apologizes and asks Deathstroke to accompany him. Inside, Creeper is being vivisected by Solomon Grundy and Savage orders Grundy to knock Deathstroke out. Deathstroke wakes up, finding Savage ready to vivisect both Deathstroke and Creeper's organs to discover how they manage to overcome the infection and create a vaccine. Rose arrives and stabs Savage. As she saves both Slade and Creeper she suddenly tells everyone to run, as an infected Wonder Woman comes crashing in. Wonder Woman rips Savage in half and is charged at by Grundy, who she punches through the wall. All the villains in the hideout open fire on Wonder Woman as Mirror Master opens a portal back to the orphanage for the villains to escape. Captain Cold stays behind to hold off Wonder Woman, Mirror Master goes back to get Captain Cold but is bitten by him. Slade realizes that both Mirror Master and Captain Cold are infected since they do not return in time. The heroes and villains decide to make the orphanage their last stand. 

Deathstroke explains that the Anti-Living can likely sense living creatures to explain how Wonder Woman found their hideout. Jason concurs with this theory as a horde of Anti-living have been accumulating outside the orphanages walls. Deathstroke proposes that everyone in the orphanage must be prepared to face off the Anti-Living. Gordon opposes this plan but eventually acquiesces to the training of the children, as long as the villains do not abuse their hospitality or commit any crimes. Rose points out the infected sealed in the cafeteria, and the villains agree that they must be eliminated. Gordon refuses at first, but ultimately allows them to kill the infected inside, including an infected Billy Batson. For three months, Batgirl and the remaining villains teach the kids various fighting skills. The villains slowly start to bond with the kids, Deadshot teaches a boy named Zaid how to shoot with a slingshot, Solomon Grundy plays with the children, and Cheetah grows attached to a girl named Matilda. Deathstroke and Jason argue over the harshness of his training before imploring Jason and Rose to take advantage of finding happiness together. One night, while patrolling the orphanage, Bane gets slashed by an infected Mirror Master, while Deadshot sacrifices himself to save Zaid from being taken by him. Gordon realizes they must avoid mirrors at all cost before finding an injured Cassandra. She informs him that Bane ran right through her to the outside, where the group spots the infected Bane opening a hole in the walls surrounding the orphanage, allowing the horde of infected to enter.  

Bane and the infected charge at the group as Gordon orders everyone inside. Before Bane can pursue, Solomon Grundy arrives and rips off Bane's head and throws it at the infected. Creeper saves Solomon Grundy from a swarm of infected as the remaining group retreat deeper into the orphanage. Gordon suggest they go to Ivy's garden in Gotham City and the group boards two armored school buses led by the Batmobile. On the bus, Mirror Master attacks Slade before taking two of the children through the windows, but Cheetah kills Mirror Master before he can take Matilda. The survivors regroup and continue towards Gotham as Ivy's garden comes into view, but also discover a massive horde of Anti-Living outside of it. Before they can proceed an infected Wonder Woman slams into the Batmobile while a horde of infected swarm the group. Cheetah, Solomon Grundy, and Creeper disembark to fight off the infected Wonder Woman and buy the group some time. Cassandra leads the children from Deathstroke's now broken bus to Lady Shiva's bus, but Cassandra is pulled off before she can board. Lady Shiva instructs a girl named Letitia to keep on driving, while she goes and helps Cassandra back on board, but before she can board the bus, Shiva is slashed by an infected. Lady Shiva tells Cassandra that she was the only person she admired, before committing suicide. 

The infected Wonder Woman kills Cheetah, Creeper, and Solomon Grundy. Deathstroke tells Jason to take care of Rose, and Rose hugs Deathstroke before Slade stays behind to make a final stand. He faces off waves of Anti-Living, before being killed by Wonder Woman. Wonder Woman then pursues and grabs the bus, lifting it into the air and hurling it at the ground. Before it hits the ground, someone yells "Shazam!" and Mary Marvel arrives preventing the bus from crashing. Mary reveals that she was the mystery hero who locked the infected away in the cafeteria, and easily takes down the infected Wonder Woman. She takes the remaining survivors into the sanctuary where they are greeted by Poison Ivy, Harley Quinn, Doctor Fate, John Constantine, and Zatanna. Doctor Fate explains they are truly safe as the Anti-Living cannot breach the walls of the garden as it has been enchanted with magic. The remaining characters finally relax, but not before erecting a statue of the fallen villains, as a memorial for their sacrifice.

Hope at World's End 
An anthology series featuring stories of various heroes. Jimmy Olsen saves some of his co-workers in the initial outbreak of the virus and documents the heroes' actions throughout the DCeased event. A time-jump foreshadows the coming of an Anti-Life Army. In Kahndaq, Black Adam stops the initial spread of the virus by killing any infected citizens. Martian Manhunter recruits Superman and Wonder Woman to ask Black Adam to open Khandaq's borders but he refuses. Adam tours Kahndaq but is attacked by an infected boy. As he tries to shout "Shazam!", the boy claws at his face, and he transforms back into a turned Black Adam. In Keystone City, Wally West, Max Mercury, Impulse and Jesse Quick evacuate the uninfected residents to an alternate Earth. While they succeed, Max becomes infected. Before he can turn, Wally runs with him so he can join the Speed Force.

Sequels

Dead Planet
Set five years after the original mini-series, Dead Planet follows the New Justice League as they return to an Earth now overrun with the anti-living in search of Cyborg, who manages to activate a distress beacon in his head (secretly installed by Batman) to transmit a message in Morse code. As the heroes return to Earth to respond to the signal, they are attacked by Wonder Woman, who infects Green Arrow. Learning from Cyborg that there's a cure for the infection, Jon rushes to stop an enraged Green Canary from killing Wonder Woman but is too late and is accidentally injured by the kryptonite sword in the process. 

While guarding Chicago, Roy Harper is killed by Beatriz da Costa while the group of civilians he was protecting are saved by Shadowpact, a strike force composed of Zatanna, Blue Devil, Ragman, Detective Chimp, John Constantine, Ravager, and Red Hood). Wonder Girl takes Jon to Poison Ivy's jungle sanctuary for medical attention and reunites with the survirors there, including Mary Marvel, Doctor Fate and Cassandra Cain. Meanwhile, Swamp Thing appears and convinces Shadowpact to travel with him to Australia after he reveals a disturbance in the Green and tells them there is a bunker of human survivors holed up there. They arrive at the bunker but are attacked by an infected Plastic Man, who kills Ragman.  

Blue Devil saves Zatanna at the cost of his life, and Swamp Thing protects the group long enough for Zatanna to kill Plastic Man. Inside the bunker, Shadowpact are attacked by Penguin, Maxwell Lord and Professor Ivo. Jason Blood, who is also in the bunker, tells Constantine that Trigon is coming to destroy the Earth since the Anti-Life is preventing people from dying. Swamp Thing is angered that the villains are torturing Floronic Man and forcing him to produce food for them but he and Shadowpact are forced to flee when Penguin reveals his plan to use an army of Amazos to take back the earth. Damian Wayne warmly embraces Commissioner James Gordon and Jon wakes up with Krypto by his side. Cyborg tells everyone that the cure is inside him but that he is unable to access it, so Constantine goes to Mister Miracle in order to obtain a Motherbox which may be able to help them. 

Miracle and a group of heroes travel to New Genesis to track down the Mobius Chair used by Metron, believing that the knowledge stored within it will allow Cyborg to access the cure. Jon finds Green Canary, who had fled with the infected Green Arrow and convinces her to help them. The group make a deal with Metron by allowing him access to Madame Xanadu's crystal ball in exchange for allowing Cyborg to use the Mobius Chair. Cyborg learns to recode his blood in order to produce the cure, and everyone returns to Earth just as Darkseid returns and attacks the New Gods. 

Etrigan warns that Trigon will arrive in three days, so Constantine enlists the help of Red Hood, Damian, Ravager Cassandra Cain and Swamp Thing to go to the hidden city of Nanda Parbat to retrieve the Spear of Destiny from Deadman. They then go to the Rock of Eternity where an infected Captain Marvel Jr. kills Red Hood before Cassandra takes the staff from Shazam and uses her newfound lightning powers to kill Captain Marvel Jr. Damian punches Constantine for causing Red Hood's death, and Spectre appears in front of Constantine but leaves looking into his mind and seeing his plan. 

Swamp Thing links Damian, Poison Ivy, Harley Quinn, Wally West, Detective Chimp, Mary Marvel, and Cyborg to the Green to create the cure. Mister Miracle convinces Green Canary to let Big Barda be the first test subject and she is subsequently healed when Jon injects the cure into her. Zatanna and the Phantom Stranger confront Constantine on his actions but, following another message from Etrigan, Constantine tells everyone that the villains are about to unleash their Amazo army to destroy the Anti-Living. Using his super-speed, Wally is able to mass-produce the cure and he and Jon attempt to deliver it to as many people as possible before they are destroyed by the Amazos or by Trigon, who manifests in Paris.

Constantine attacks Doctor Fate and takes his helmet, combining it with the Spear of Destiny, Ragman's cloak, Xanadu's crystall ball and the staff of Shazam to become the most powerful magical entity on Earth. He uses the clock to absorb the souls of Penguin and Maxwell Lord so that Jon and Damian can shut down the Amazo army. Constantine arrives in Paris to battle Trigon alongside Zatanna and the Stranger. Jon arrives and distracts Trigon long enough for Constantine to take control of his mind and forces him to stab himself with the Spear of Destiny, killing Trigon once and for all. Constantine's spirit says goodbye to Zatanna, accepting that his actions have also destroyed his own soul. With Trigon and the Amazo army defeated, the heroes celebrate the curing of the world, with Jon reuniting with his grandfather and Green Canary reuniting with Green Arrow.

War of the Undead Gods
As Brainiac and his forces destroy Krypton, Supergirl is sent to New Genesis by her parents so that she can be raised among Gods. Five years later, Supergirl's transport arrives on New Genesis only for her to be immediately attacked by infected New Gods. On Earth, Jon, Cyborg, Wonder Girl, Green Canary, Mary Marvel and Shazam (Cassandra Cain) travel to the Sun and battle an infected Superman. On Earth-2, President Lois Lane sends John Stewart and Guy Gardener to investigate why their neighboring planets have not been responding to their communication requests as Jon and Damien arrive through a Boom Tube with a cured Superman and Jonathan Kent. The Superman family tearfully reunites while Damien breaks the news to Alfred that the Anti-Living could be cured, meaning he killed Bruce, Dick and Tim unnecessarily. Big Barda and Mr. Miracle depart for New Genesis to reunite with their son, Jacob. The next day, Brainiac probes approach Earth-2 but are dispatched by Superman, Jon and Jessica Cruz. The two Supermen enter the ship and find a decimated Brainiac, who warns them that the infected New Gods are coming.

Big Barda and Mr. Miracle return to New Genesis to find it has been destroyed by Unliving Darkseid. Barda attempts to enter a corrupted Boom Tube but is stopped by Black Racer, who reveals that all Motherboxes have been corrupted by the Anti-Life and can only be passed through by the Anti-Living. Darkseid and his army of infected New Gods lay siege to the planet Korugar, with the fear of its populace reaching out to Warworld, where Sinestro and his Yellow Lanterns reside. Despite Guy's reservations, Superman and Lois decide to work with Brainiac in order to find a way to stop the New Gods. The Yellow Lanterns attempt to fire on Korugar but are intercepted by Soranik Natu and her husband Kyle Rayner. Sinestro attempts to explain that they are trying to save the planet but an infected Supergirl attacks them, injuring Kyle and infecting Warworld with the Anti-Life virus. Darkseid then arrives, decapitates Sinestro and acquires his ring, becoming a Yellow Lantern as Kyle and Soranik flee to the Guardians of the Universe and warn them to gather the Green Lanterns. Adam Strange, pulled from the Rann–Thanagar War, arrives on Earth two months before the cure is found and is infected by Wonder Woman. When he returns home, he kills his family and infects the Thanagarian army, gaining the attention of Lobo who kills a platoon of soldiers. During Wonder Woman's funeral, Ares arrives and warns the heroes that the Anti-Living will destroy the universe.

Alfred, now living with Leslie Thompkins, struggles with his guilt over the deaths of his sons and begs to join Damian in the fight against the Anti-Living. On Almerac, Maxima orders her people to evacuate their homeworld while she stays behind to fight the undead, though she is defeated by the combined forces of Darkseid and the Forever People. Manipulated by Ares, the Green Lantern Corps fight the other heroes after the Guardians announce that the best course of action is to destroy the Anti-Living rather than risk trying to cure them. Mister Mxyzptlk appears and joins Superman and the Lanterns as they race to save a planet that is under attack while Superman orders Jon to return to Earth-2 to protect their family. Mxyzptlk is infected and uses his powers to kill John Stewart and Kilowog and destroy the Green Lantern power battery. Despite the decision of the other cosmic beings to sacrifice the universe and move on to another, Spectre refuses, repairs the battery, and battles Mxyzptlk.

Meanwhile, Lobo accepts a contract to save the universe from the Anti-Living and sets out. Superman, still stunned by Mxyzptlk's sudden infection and destruction of the entire planet tries to calm a hopeless Kyle Rayner as the latter tells him they've lost. Superman feels an intense surge of rage towards the lost lives of billions towards an undead Darkseid and sets forth as Spectre and Mxyptlk continue to fiercely battle. Back on Earth-2, the new Justice League consults on how to cure billions of the Anti-Life virus. While they formulate a plan, Brainiac notices that Mister Miracle's motherbox has been infected and linked, notifying the infected new gods as they lay siege to Earth-2 shortly after. President Lois Lane orders everyone to evacuate to the arks as Adam Strange infects Leslie Thompkins. Back in space, Superman deals a stunning blow that gives the Spectre the momentum to deal a fatal blow to Mxyzpltk. However, Mxyzptlk then tears out the Spectre's host Jim Corrigan from the inside as the imp dies. As Superman holds a dying Corrigan, he tells him to not let the universe fall. On Earth-2, an undead Highfather crash lands as Damian Wayne tells the crowd to run as he keeps Highfather busy. Despite Damian's valiant efforts, Highfather proves too strong and Alfred steps in. With his anger raging and not willing to let another son die, his anger is enough for the power of the Spectre to surge within him, coronating Alfred the new Spectre and shortly killing Highfather with a punch through the skull.

Collected editions 
The first collection of DCeased was a limited edition Hardcover of 1,400 copies released for Local Comics Book Day 2019 featuring a cover with an infected Joker. The mass market hardcover collection was released on November 26, 2019 with Batman on the cover while a Barnes & Noble Exclusive Variant featured a Superman Cover and a bonus cover gallery. Each edition collects the six issue original DCeased mini-series and DCeased: A Good Day to Die one-shot.

A hardcover collection of DCeased: Unkillables was released on August 25, 2020.

A hardcover collection of DCeased: Dead Planet was released on April 27, 2021.

A hardcover collection of DCeased: Hope at World's End was released on June 15, 2021.

Critical reception 
The series has received critical acclaim, with critics praising the art, the plot, and the tone of the comic. According to Comic Book Roundup, the series has a score of 8.6/10.

The sequel also received critical acclaim with critics praising the art, plot, and the optimistic finale. According to Comic Book Roundup, the series has a score of 8.7 out of 10.

See also 
 Marvel Zombies – a similar storyline published by Marvel Comics.
 Blackest Night - a similar crossover storyline published by DC Comics

References 

Apocalyptic comics
DC Comics limited series
One-shot comic titles
Horror comics
2019 comics debuts
Superhero comics
Zombies in comics
DC Comics dimensions